The CONCACAF Futsal Championship is the main national futsal competition of the CONCACAF nations. It was first held in 1996, and it is held every four years.

Results

1996: http://old.futsalplanet.com/old/Statistics/data/CONCACAF.txt + http://old.futsalplanet.com/old/story/CONCACAF/1-Concacaf-96.htm

2000: http://old.futsalplanet.com/old/Story/CONCACAF/2-Concacaf-00.htm

Overall team records
In this ranking 3 points are awarded for a win, 1 for a draw and 0 for a loss. As per statistical convention in football, matches decided in extra time are counted as wins and losses, while matches decided by penalty shoot-outs are counted as draws. Teams are ranked by total points, then by goal difference, then by goals scored.

Medal table

Comprehensive team results by tournament
Legend
1st — Champions
2nd — Runners-up
3rd — Third place
4th — Fourth place
QF — Quarterfinals
R1 — Round 1
Q — Qualified for upcoming tournament
 •  — Did not qualify / Withdrew
   — Hosts

FIFA Futsal World Cup Qualifiers
Legend
1st – Champions
2nd – Runners-up
3rd – Third place
4th – Fourth place
QF – Quarterfinals
R2 – Round 2 (1989–2008, second group stage, top 8; 2012–present: knockout round of 16)
R1 – Round 1
     – Hosts

Q – Qualified for upcoming tournament

References

External links
 CONCACAF Futsal page
 1996 CONCACAF Futsal Championship
 2000 CONCACAF Futsal Championship
 2004 CONCACAF Futsal Championship

 
CONCACAF competitions
International futsal competitions
Recurring sporting events established in 1996
Futsal competitions in North America